Rust for Linux is a series of patches to the Linux kernel that adds Rust as a second programming language to C for writing kernel components.

History 

The Linux kernel has been primarily written in C and assembly language since its first release in 1991. Around 1997, the addition of C++ was considered and experimented upon for two weeks before being scrapped. Rust was created in 2006 and combines the performance of low-level programming languages (such as C) with a focus on memory safety and a user-friendly tool set and syntax.

The Rust for Linux project was announced in 2020 in the Linux kernel mailing list with goals of leveraging Rust's memory safety to reduce bugs when writing kernel drivers. At the Open Source Summit 2022, Linus Torvalds stated that the incorporation of the project's work could begin as soon as the Linux 5.20 release, later named as Linux 6.0. The first release candidate for Linux 6.0 was created on 14 August 2022, without Rust support. In the release notes for Linux 6.0-rc1, Torvalds expressed his intention for adding Rust support, "I actually was hoping that we'd get some of the first rust infrastructure, and the multi-gen LRU VM, but neither of them happened this time around." On 19 September 2022, an article from ZDNet revealed an email from Linus Torvalds stating that "Unless something odd happens, it [Rust] will make it into 6.1".

In October 2022, a pull request for accepting the implementation for Rust for Linux was approved by Torvalds.

References 

Free software programmed in Rust
Linux software projects